Snorrastofa is an independent research centre established in 1995 in Reykholt in West Iceland.

The centre was the main residence of Snorri Sturluson (1179–1241). Its main task is to instigate and conduct research on the medieval period in general, and Snorri and his works in particular.

References

External links 
 Snorrastofa's Official Website

Biographical museums in Iceland
Western Region (Iceland)
Museums established in 1995
1995 establishments in Iceland